Valea Calului may refer to the following places in Romania:

 Valea Calului, a village the commune Șuici, Argeș County
 Valea Calului, a tributary of the Fiad in Bistrița-Năsăud County
 Valea Calului, a tributary of the Pogăniș in Caraș-Severin County
 Valea Calului, a tributary of the Timiș in Brașov County
 Valea Calului, a tributary of the Iara in Cluj County
 Valea Calului, a tributary of the Râul Târgului in Argeș County

See also 
 Calul (disambiguation)